Karel Frankenstein (born 19 April 1897, died between 1940 and 1945) was a Czech sprinter. He competed in the men's 400 metres at the 1920 Summer Olympics.

References

1897 births
1940s deaths
Year of death missing
Athletes (track and field) at the 1920 Summer Olympics
Czech male sprinters
Olympic athletes of Czechoslovakia
Place of birth missing